The 2017–18 season was Real Madrid's 87th in existence, their 35th consecutive season in the top flight of Spanish basketball and 11th consecutive season in the top flight of European basketball.

The season was an extremely successful one, as Real Madrid won a record tenth EuroLeague title after defeating Fenerbahçe in the final. In the domestic Liga ACB, Madrid clinched the title after defeating Saski Baskonia in the playoff finals. The star player of this season was Slovenian Luka Dončić, who was named EuroLeague MVP, EuroLeague Final Four MVP and Liga ACB MVP.

Players

Squad information

}

Depth chart

Players in

|}

Players out

|}

Club

Technical staff

Kit

Supplier: Adidas / Sponsor: Universidad Europea

Pre-season and friendlies

Competitions

Overall

Overview

Liga ACB

League table

Results summary

Results by round

Matches

Results overview

ACB Playoffs

Quarterfinals

Semifinals

Final

EuroLeague

League table

Results summary

All points scored in extra period(s) will not be counted in the standings, nor for any tie-break situation.

Results by round

Matches

Results overview

Euroleague Playoffs

Quarterfinals

 
Ral Madrid win the series 3-1

Euroleague Final Four

Semi-final

Final

Copa del Rey

Quarterfinals

Semifinals

Final

Supercopa de España

Statistics

Liga ACB

EuroLeague

Copa del Rey

Supercopa de España

References

External links
 Official website
 Real Madrid  at ACB.com 
 Real Madrid at EuroLeague.net

 
Real
Madrid